Jan Vreman (born 17 September 1965) is a Dutch football manager and former player, who most recently managed Dutch football club De Graafschap.

Playing career
Vreman spent his entire playing career with Dutch football club De Graafschap. His stay with the club earned him the nickname Mister De Graafschap.

Managerial career
On 3 January 2014, Vreman became interim manager of De Graafschap as a replacement for Pieter Huistra. On 25 March 2014, De Graafschap appointed Vreman as their permanent manager.

In his first full season in charge, Vreman guided De Graafschap to promotion to the Eredivisie after beating Almere City, Go Ahead Eagles and FC Volendam in the promotion/relegation play-offs.

References

1965 births
Living people
Dutch footballers
De Graafschap players
Eerste Divisie players
Eredivisie players
Association football defenders
Dutch football managers
De Graafschap managers
Eredivisie managers
Eerste Divisie managers
People from Winterswijk
Footballers from Gelderland
De Graafschap non-playing staff